The 1986 Lesotho coup d'état was a military coup that took place in Lesotho on 20 January 1986, led by General Justin Lekhanya. It led to the deposition of Prime Minister Leabua Jonathan, who held the office since 1965 and assumed dictatorial powers in the 1970 coup d'état, after the general election was annulled.

General Lekhanya announced the creation of the Military Council, which would exercise all executive and legislative powers in the name of King Moshoeshoe II. Eventually, a power struggle developed between Lekhanya and the King, with the latter being forced into exile in the United Kingdom in February 1990, and officially dethroned in December of that year. Lekhanya himself was deposed in the 1991 coup d'état, led by Colonel Elias Phisoana Ramaema.

References 

Military coups in Lesotho
1986 in Lesotho
Conflicts in 1986
1980s coups d'état and coup attempts
January 1986 events in Africa